Jack Steele is a Scottish rugby union player who played for Glasgow Warriors at the Centre position and now plays for Glasgow Hawks.

Rugby Union career

Amateur career

Steele played for Dundee HSFP before finding himself on the Warriors radar.

He moved to the Glasgow Hawks in 2014.

Professional career

He secured an Elite Development Programme place in 2013 with Glasgow Warriors aligned to Dundee HSFP  and the contract allows Steele to play for Dundee HSFP if not playing for the Glasgow Warriors.

Steele secured another EDP placement in 2014 with Glasgow Warriors this time aligned to Glasgow Hawks. Again, the EDP contract signed allows Steele to play for Glasgow Hawks if not playing for the Glasgow Warriors.

He has played 1 competitive game for Glasgow Warriors coming on a substitute in 2013-14 season against Newport Gwent Dragons.

International career

Steele has represented Scotland at Under 20 level. and at Club XV.

References

External links 
 Scottish Rugby name new elite development players

Living people
Scottish rugby union players
1992 births
Rugby union centres
Glasgow Warriors players
Dundee HSFP players
Glasgow Hawks players
Scotland Club XV international rugby union players